Darimeta railway station is a railway station of Bhopal–Nagpur section under Nagpur CR railway division of West Central Railway zone of Indian Railways. The station is situated beside State Highway 246 at Gujarkhedi, Karvhar in Chhindwara district of Indian state of Madhya Pradesh.

History
The Bhopal–Itarsi line was opened by the Begum of Bhopal in 1884. Itarsi and Nagpur Junction railway station was linked in between 1923 and 1924. Electrification started in Bhopal–Itarsi section in 1988–89 and the rest Itarsi to Nagpur section was electrified in 1990–91.

References

Nagpur CR railway division
Railway stations in Chhindwara district